

Events

January–March 

 January 3–4 – Sino-French War – Battle of Núi Bop: French troops under General Oscar de Négrier defeat a numerically superior Qing Chinese force, in northern Vietnam.
 January 4 – The first successful appendectomy is performed by Dr. William W. Grant, on Mary Gartside.
 January 17 – Mahdist War in Sudan – Battle of Abu Klea: British troops defeat Mahdist forces. 
 January 20 – American inventor LaMarcus Adna Thompson patents a roller coaster.
 January 24 – Irish rebels damage Westminster Hall and the Tower of London with dynamite.
 January 26 – Mahdist War in Sudan: Troops loyal to Mahdi Muhammad Ahmad conquer Khartoum; British commander Charles George Gordon is killed.
 February 5 – King Leopold II of Belgium establishes the Congo Free State, as a personal possession.
 February 9 – The first Japanese arrive in Hawaii.
 February 16 – Charles Dow publishes the first edition of the Dow Jones Industrial Average. The index stood at a level of 62.76, and represented the dollar average of 14 stocks: 12 railroads and two leading American industries.
 February 20 – The Richmond Football Club was officially formed at the Royal Hotel in the Melbourne suburb of Richmond, Victoria.
 February 21 – United States President Chester A. Arthur dedicates the Washington Monument.
 February 23
 Sino-French War – Battle of Đồng Đăng: France gains an important victory over China, in the Tonkin region of modern-day Vietnam.
 An English executioner fails after several attempts to hang John Babbacombe Lee, sentenced for the murder of his employer Emma Keyse; Lee's sentence is commuted to life imprisonment.
 February 26 – The final act of the Berlin Conference regulates European colonization and trade, in the scramble for Africa.
 February 28 – February concludes without having a full moon.
 March 3 – A subsidiary of the American Bell Telephone Company, American Telephone and Telegraph (AT&T), is incorporated in New York.
 March 4 – Grover Cleveland is sworn in, as the 22nd president of the United States.
 March 7 – The Roman Catholic Archdiocese of Madrid is founded.
 March 14 – Gilbert and Sullivan's comic opera The Mikado opens, at the Savoy Theatre in London.
 March 26
 Prussian deportations: The Prussian government, motivated by Otto von Bismarck, expels all ethnic Poles and Jews without German citizenship from Prussia.
 The North-West Rebellion in Canada by the Métis people, led by Louis Riel, begins with the Battle of Duck Lake.
 First legal cremation in England: Mrs Jeannette C. Pickersgill of London, "well known in literary and scientific circles", is cremated by the Cremation Society at Woking, Surrey.
 March 30 – The Battle for Kushka triggers the Panjdeh Incident, which nearly gives rise to war between the British Empire and Russian Empire.
 March 31 – The United Kingdom establishes the Bechuanaland Protectorate.

April–June 
 April 2 – Frog Lake Massacre: Cree warriors led by Wandering Spirit kill 9 settlers at Frog Lake in the Northwest Territories.
 April 3 – Gottlieb Daimler is granted a German patent, for his single-cylinder, water-cooled engine design.
 April 11 – Luton Town Football Club is created by the merger of (Luton) Wanderers F.C. and Luton Excelsior F.C. in England.
 April 14 – Sino-French War: A French victory at Kép causes China to withdraw its forces from Tonkin, in the final engagement of the conflict.
 April 30 – A bill is signed in the New York State legislature, forming the Niagara Falls State Park.
 May 2
 Good Housekeeping magazine goes on sale for the first time in the United States.
 North-West Rebellion – Battle of Cut Knife: Cree and Assiniboine warriors win their largest victory over Canadian forces.
 The Congo Free State is established, by King Leopold II of Belgium.
 May 9–12 – North-West Rebellion – Battle of Batoche: Canadian government forces inflict a decisive defeat on Métis rebels, bringing an end to their part in the rebellion.
 May 19 – After a three-month legislative battle in the Illinois General Assembly, John A. Logan is re-elected to the United States Senate.
 May 20 – The first public train departs Swanage railway station, on the newly built Swanage Railway in England.
 June 3 – Battle of Loon Lake: The Canadian North-West Mounted Police and allies force a party of Plains Cree warriors to surrender in the last skirmish of the North-West Rebellion, and the last battle fought on Canadian soil.
 June 17 – The Statue of Liberty arrives in New York Harbor.
 June 23 – Robert Gascoyne-Cecil, 3rd Marquess of Salisbury, becomes Prime Minister of the United Kingdom.

July–September 
 July – Japan Brewery, predecessor of Kirin Holdings was founded in Yokohama, Japan.
 July 6 – Louis Pasteur and Émile Roux successfully test their rabies vaccine. The patient is Joseph Meister, a boy who was bitten by a rabid dog.
 July 14 – Sarah E. Goode is the first African-American woman to apply for and receive a patent, for the invention of the hideaway bed.
 July 15 – The Reservation at Niagara Falls opens, enabling access to all for free. Thomas V. Welch is the first Superintendent of the Park.
 July 16 – BHP (Broken Hill Proprietary), a worldwide mining and natural gas producer is founded in New South Wales, Australia.
 July 20 – The laws of Professional football are formalised in Britain.
 July 28 – Louis Riel's trial for treason begins in Regina.
 August 19 – S Andromedae, the only supernova seen in the Andromeda Galaxy so far by astronomers, and the first ever noted outside the Milky Way, is discovered.

 August 29 – Gottlieb Daimler is granted a German patent for the Daimler Reitwagen, regarded as the first motorcycle, which he has produced with Wilhelm Maybach.
 September 2 – The Rock Springs massacre occurs in Rock Springs, Wyoming; 150 white miners attack their Chinese coworkers, killing 28, wounding 15, and forcing several hundred more out of town.
 September 6 – Eastern Rumelia declares its union with Bulgaria, completing the Unification of Bulgaria.
 September 8 – Saint Thomas Academy is founded in Minnesota.
 September 12 – Arbroath FC defeats Bon Accord FC, 36-0, in the highest score ever in professional football.
 September 15 – A train wreck of the P. T. Barnum Circus kills giant elephant Jumbo, at St. Thomas, Ontario.
 September 18 – The union of Eastern Rumelia with Bulgaria is proclaimed at Plovdiv.
 September 30 – A British force abolishes the Boer republic of Stellaland, and adds it to British Bechuanaland.

October–December 
 October 3 – Millwall F.C. is founded by workers on the Isle of Dogs in London, as Millwall Rovers.
 October 12 – The city of Fresno, California, is incorporated.
 October 13 – The Georgia Institute of Technology is established in Atlanta as the Georgia School of Technology.
 October 25 – Symphony No. 4 (Brahms) is premiered in Meiningen, Germany, with Johannes Brahms himself conducting it. 
 November – The Third Anglo-Burmese War begins.
 November 7 – Canadian Pacific Railway: In Craigellachie, British Columbia, construction ends on a railway extending across Canada. Prime Minister John A. Macdonald considers the project to be vital to Canada, due to the exponentially greater potential for military mobility.
 November 14–28 – Serbo-Bulgarian War: Serbia declares war against Bulgaria, but is defeated in the Battle of Slivnitsa on November 17–19.
 November 16 – Louis Riel, Canadian rebel leader of the Métis, is executed for high treason.
 December 1 – The U.S. Patent Office acknowledges this date as the day Dr Pepper is served for the first time; the exact date of Dr. Pepper's invention is unknown.
 December 28 – 72 Indian lawyers, academics and journalists gather in Bombay to form the Congress Party.

Date unknown 

 Karl Benz produces the Benz Patent-Motorwagen, regarded as the first automobile (patented and publicly launched the following year).
 John Kemp Starley demonstrates the Rover safety bicycle, regarded as the first practical modern bicycle.
 The Home Insurance Building in Chicago, designed by William Le Baron Jenney, is completed. With ten floors and a fireproof weight-bearing metal frame, it is regarded as the first skyscraper.
 Bicycle Playing Cards are first produced.
 The Soldiers' and Sailors' Families Association is established in the United Kingdom, to provide charitable assistance.
 Camp Dudley, the oldest continually running boys' camp in the United States, is founded.
 John Ormsby publishes his new English translation of Don Quixote, acclaimed as the most scholarly made up to that time. It will remain in print through the 20th century.
 Michigan Technological University (originally Michigan Mining School) opens its doors for the first time, in the future Houghton County Fire Hall.
 Chuo Law College, as predecessor of Chuo University, founded in Kanda, Tokyo, Japan.
 Before November 1 – More than 24,000 Christians killed, 225 churches burnt, seventeen orphanages and ten convents destroyed in Cochinchina, now known as Vietnam.

Births

January 

 January 6 – Florence Turner, American actress (d. 1946)
 January 8 – John Curtin, 14th Prime Minister of Australia (d. 1945)
 January 11
 Jack Hoxie, American actor, rodeo performer (d. 1965)
 Alice Paul, American women's rights activist (d. 1977)
 January 12
 Harry Benjamin, American endocrinologist, sexologist (d. 1986)
 Claude Fuess, American author, historian and headmaster (d. 1963)
 January 14 – Constantin Sănătescu, 44th prime minister of Romania (d. 1947)
 January 16 – Zhou Zuoren, Chinese writer (d. 1967)
 January 17 – Nikolaus von Falkenhorst, German general and war criminal (d. 1968)
 January 21 – Umberto Nobile, Italian aviator and explorer (d. 1978)
 January 25 – Roy Geiger, American general (d. 1947)
 January 26 – Harry Ricardo, English mechanical engineer, engine pioneer (d. 1974)
 January 27
 Jerome Kern, American composer (d. 1945)
 Harry Ruby, American musician, composer, and writer (d. 1974)
 January 28 – Władysław Raczkiewicz, President of Poland (d. 1947)
 January 30 – John Henry Towers, U. S.admiral and naval aviation pioneer (d. 1955)

February 

 February 1 – Friedrich Kellner, German diarist (d. 1970)
 February 7
 Sinclair Lewis, American writer, Nobel Prize laureate (d. 1951)
 Hugo Sperrle, German field marshal (d. 1953)
 February 9 – Alban Berg, Austrian composer (d. 1935)
 February 10 – Rupert Downes, Australian general (d. 1945)
 February 13
 George Fitzmaurice, French-American motion picture director (d. 1940)
 Bess Truman, First Lady of the United States (d. 1982)
 February 14 – Zengo Yoshida, Japanese admiral (d. 1966)
 February 21 – Sacha Guitry, Russian-born French dramatist, writer, director, and actor (d. 1957)
 February 22 – Pat Sullivan, Australian-born American director, animated film producer (d. 1933)
 February 24
 Chester W. Nimitz, American admiral (d. 1966)
 Stanisław Ignacy Witkiewicz, Polish writer, painter (d. 1939)
 February 25 – Princess Alice of Battenberg (d. 1969)
 February 26 – Aleksandras Stulginskis, President of Lithuania (d. 1969)

March 
 March 6 – Ring Lardner, American writer (d. 1933)
 March 7 – John Tovey, British admiral of the fleet (d. 1971)
 March 11 – Sir Malcolm Campbell, English land, water racer (d. 1948)
 March 14 – Raoul Lufbery, French-born American World War I pilot (d. 1918)
 March 23 – Mollie McNutt, Australian poet (d. 1919)
 March 27 – Julio Lozano Díaz, President of Honduras (d. 1957)
 March 31 – Jules Pascin, Bulgarian painter (d. 1930)

April 

 April 1 
 Wallace Beery, American actor (d. 1949)
 Clementine Churchill, wife of British Prime Minister Winston Churchill (d. 1977)
 April 3
 Allan Dwan, Canadian-born American film director (d. 1981)
Bud Fisher, American cartoonist (Mutt and Jeff) (d. 1954)
 St John Philby, Ceylonese-born British orientalist (d. 1960)
 April 12 – Hermann Hoth, German general (d. 1971)
 April 13
 John Cunningham, British admiral (d. 1962)
 Otto Plath, American father of poet Sylvia Plath, entomologist (d. 1940)
 April 15 – Tadeusz Kutrzeba, Polish general (d. 1947)
 April 16 – Charles Debbas, 1st president, 5th prime minister of Lebanon (d. 1935)
 April 17 – Karen Blixen, Danish author (d. 1962)
 April 29 – Frank Jack Fletcher, American admiral (d. 1973)

May 

 May 2 – Hedda Hopper, American columnist (d. 1966)
 May 5 – Agustín Barrios, Paraguayan guitarist, composer (d. 1944)
 May 7 – George "Gabby" Hayes, American actor (d. 1969)
 May 8 – Thomas B. Costain, Canadian author and journalist (d. 1965)
 May 9 – Eduard C. Lindeman, American social worker, author (d. 1953)
 May 14 – Otto Klemperer, German conductor (d. 1973)
 May 15
Robert James Hudson, Governor of Southern Rhodesia (d. 1963)
Naokuni Nomura, Japanese admiral and Minister of the Navy (d. 1973)
 May 20 – Faisal I of Iraq (d. 1933)
 May 21 – Sophie, Princess of Albania, consort of William of Wied, Prince of Albania (d. 1936)
 May 22 – Toyoda Soemu, Japanese admiral (d. 1957)
 May 24 – Susan Sutherland Isaacs, English educational psychologist, psychoanalyst (d. 1948)
 May 27 – Richmond K. Turner, American admiral (d. 1961)
 May 30 – Arthur E. Andersen, American accountant (d. 1947)

June 
 June 2 – Hans Gerhard Creutzfeldt, German neuropathologist (d. 1964)
 June 4 – Arturo Rawson, President of Argentina (d. 1952)
 June 5 – Georges Mandel, French politician, World War II hero (d. 1944)
 June 9
 John Edensor Littlewood, British mathematician (d. 1977)
 Felicjan Sławoj Składkowski, Prime Minister of Poland (d. 1962)
 Harry Gribbon, American comedy actor (d. 1961)
 June 21 – Harry A. Marmer, Ukrainian-born American mathematician, oceanographer (d. 1953)
 June 22 – Milan Vidmar, Slovenian electrical engineer, chess player (d. 1962)
 June 27 – Guilhermina Suggia, Portuguese cellist (d. 1950)
 June 29 – Izidor Kürschner, Hungarian football player and coach (d. 1941)

July 
 July 2 – Nikolai Krylenko, Russian Bolshevik and Soviet politician (d. 1938)
 July 4 – Louis B. Mayer, American film producer (d. 1957)
 July 6 – Ernst Busch, German field marshal (d. 1945)
 July 8 – Paul Leni, German film director (The Cat and the Canary) (d. 1929)
 July 9 – Luo Meizhen, Chinese supercentenarian (d. 2013)
 July 14 – King Sisavang Vong of Laos (d. 1959)
 July 15
 Abd al-Rahman al-Mahdi, 1st prime minister of Sudan (d. 1959)
 July 16 – Hakuun Yasutani, Japanese Sōtō rōshi (d. 1973)
 July 19
Dumitru Coroamă, Romanian soldier and fascist activist (d. 1956)
Aristides de Sousa Mendes, Portuguese diplomat, humanitarian (d. 1954)
 July 20 – Michitarō Komatsubara, Japanese general (d. 1940)
 July 28 – Monte Attell, American boxer (d. 1960)
 July 29 – Theda Bara, American silent film actress (d. 1955)

August 

 August 1 – George de Hevesy, Hungarian chemist, Nobel Prize laureate (d. 1966)

September 

 September 6 – Otto Kruger, American actor (d. 1974)
 September 7 – Jovita Idar, Mexican-American journalist and political activist (d. 1946) 
 September 11 – D. H. Lawrence, English novelist (d. 1930)
 September 20 – Enrico Mizzi, 6th Prime Minister of Malta (d. 1950)
 September 21 – Thomas de Hartmann, Russian composer (d. 1956)
 September 22
 Ben Chifley, 16th Prime Minister of Australia (d. 1951)
 Erich von Stroheim, Austrian-born motion picture actor, director (d. 1957)
 September 25 – Mineichi Koga, Japanese admiral (d. 1944)
 September 27 – Harry Blackstone Sr., American magician and illusionist (d. 1965)

October 

 October 3 – Sophie Treadwell, American playwright, journalist (d. 1970)
 October 7 – Niels Bohr, Danish physicist, Nobel Prize laureate (d. 1962)
 October 11 – François Mauriac, French writer, Nobel Prize laureate (d. 1970)
 October 19 – Charles E. Merrill, American banker, co-founder of Merrill Lynch (d. 1956)
 October 24 – Rachel Katznelson-Shazar, Zionist political figure, wife of third President of Israel (d. 1975)
 October 28 – Per Albin Hansson, 2-time prime minister of Sweden (d. 1946)
 October 30 – Ezra Pound, American poet (d. 1972)

November 

 November 1 – Anton Flettner, German aviation engineer, inventor (d. 1961)
 November 2 – Harlow Shapley, American astronomer (d. 1972)
 November 5 – Will Durant, American philosopher, writer (d. 1981)
 November 8 – Tomoyuki Yamashita, Japanese general (d. 1946)
 November 9 (October 28 (O.S.)) – Velimir Khlebnikov, Russian poet (d. 1922)
 November 11 – George S. Patton, American general (d. 1945)
 November 15 – Frederick Handley-Page, British aviation pioneer, aircraft company founder (d. 1962)
 November 26 – Heinrich Brüning, Chancellor of Germany 1930-1932 (d. 1970)
 November 30
 Albert Kesselring, German field marshal (d. 1960)
 Ma Zhanshan, Chinese general (d. 1950)

December 
 December 2 – George Minot, American physician, recipient of the Nobel Prize in Physiology or Medicine (d. 1950)
 December 13 – Mario Talavera, Mexican songwriter (d. 1960)
 December 19
 John Lavarack, Australian general, Governor of Queensland (1946-1957) (d. 1957)
 King Oliver, American jazz musician (d. 1938)

Date unknown
 Tuan Guru Haji Ahmad, Indonesian ulama (d. 1949)
 Geza von Hoffmann, Austrian-Hungarian eugenicist and writer (d. 1921)
 Alessandro Tonini, Italian aeronautical engineer and aircraft designer and manufacturer (d. 1932)

Deaths

January–June 

 January 11 – Mariano Ospina Rodríguez, President of Colombia (b. 1805)
 January 13 – Schuyler Colfax, 17th Vice President of the United States (b. 1823)
 January 26 – Charles "Chinese" Gordon, British general (killed in battle) (b. 1833)
 February 1 – Sidney Gilchrist Thomas, British inventor (b. 1850)
 February 7 – Iwasaki Yataro, Japanese industrialist, Founder of Mitsubishi (b. 1835)
 February 8 – Nikolai Severtzov, Russian explorer, naturalist (b. 1827)
 February 19 – José María Pinedo, Argentinian naval commander (b. 1795)
 March 12 – Próspero Fernández Oreamuno, President of Costa Rica (b. 1834)
 March 13 – Giorgio Mitrovich, Maltese politician (b. 1795)
 March 22 – Sir Harry Smith Parkes, British diplomat (b. 1828)
 April 2 – Justo Rufino Barrios, Central American leader (b. 1835)
 April 6 – Eduard Vogel von Falckenstein, Prussian general (b. 1797)
 April 25 – Queen Emma of Hawaii (b. 1836)
 May 2 – Terézia Zakoucs, Hungarian Slovene author (b. 1817)
 May 4 – Irvin McDowell, American general (b. 1818)
 May 17 – Jonathan Young, United States Navy commodore (b. 1826)
 May 19 – Robert Emmet Odlum, American swimming instructor (died as result of becoming the first person to jump from the Brooklyn Bridge) (b. 1851)
 May 20 – Frederick Theodore Frelinghuysen, 29th United States Secretary of State (b. 1817)
 May 22 – Victor Hugo, French author (b. 1802)
 June 11 – Amédée Courbet, French admiral (b. 1827)
 June 17 – Edwin Freiherr von Manteuffel, German field marshal (b. 1809)
 June 22 – Muhammad Ahmad, Sudanese Mahdi (b. 1844)

July–December 

 July 21 – Karolina Sobańska, Polish noble, agent (b. 1795)
 July 23 – Ulysses S. Grant, 63, American Civil War general, 18th President of the United States (b. 1822)
 August – Aga Khan II, Iranian religious leader (b. 1830)
 August 6 – Emil Zsigmondy, Austrian mountaineer (b. 1861)
 August 10 – James W. Marshall, American contractor, builder of Sutter's Mill (b. 1810)
 August 29 – Moriz Ludassy, Hungarian journalist (b. 1825)
 September 2 – Giuseppe Bonavia, Maltese architect (b. 1821)
 September 5 – Zuo Zongtang, Chinese general and politician (b. 1812)
 September 6 – Narcís Monturiol, Catalan intellectual, artist and engineer, inventor of the first combustion engine-driven submarine, which was propelled by an early form of air-independent propulsion (b. 1819)
 September 15 
 Jumbo, African elephant, star attraction in P. T. Barnum's circus (train accident) (b. 1861)
 Carl Spitzweg, German romanticist painter (b. 1808)
 October 1 – Anthony Ashley-Cooper, 7th Earl of Shaftesbury, British politician and philanthropist (b.1801)
 October 3 – Mazhar Nanautawi, Indian freedom struggle activist and founding figure of Mazahir Uloom (b. 1821)
 October 5 – Thomas C. Durant, American railroad financier (b. 1820)
 October 29
George B. McClellan, American Civil War general, politician (b. 1826)
 Juan Bautista Topete, Spanish admiral and politician (b. 1821)
 November 16 – Louis Riel, Canadian-American leader (executed) (b. 1844)
 November 24 – Nicolás Avellaneda, Argentine president (b. 1837)
 November 25
 King Alfonso XII of Spain (b. 1857)
 Thomas Hendricks, 21st Vice President of the United States (b. 1819)
 November 26 – Thomas Andrews, Irish chemist (b. 1813)
 December 8 – William Henry Vanderbilt, American entrepreneur (b. 1821)
 December 13 – Benjamin Gratz Brown, American politician (b. 1826)
 December 15 – Ferdinand II of Portugal, consort of Queen Maria II (b. 1816)

Date unknown 
 Eugenia Kisimova, Bulgarian feminist, philanthropist and women's rights activist (b. 1831)

In fiction 
 September 2–September 7 – The film Back to the Future Part III takes place during this time. Dr. Emmett Brown is initially murdered by Buford "Mad Dog" Tannen in Hill Valley, California (1885); however, Marty McFly later prevents this murder.
 The stage "Bury My Shell at Wounded Knee", in the 1992 video game Teenage Mutant Ninja Turtles: Turtles in Time, is set in this year.
 The Nickelodeon TV movie, Lost in the West, takes place in this year.

References

Further reading